Johann Sebastian Bach composed the church cantata  (Now come, Savior of the heathens), 62, in Leipzig for the first Sunday in Advent and first performed it on 3 December 1724. The chorale cantata is based on Martin Luther's Advent hymn "Nun komm, der Heiden Heiland". It is part of his chorale cantata cycle.

History and words 
Bach wrote the cantata in 1724, his second year as Thomaskantor in Leipzig, for the First Sunday of Advent. The prescribed readings for the Sunday were from the Epistle to the Romans, night is advanced, day will come, and from the Gospel of Matthew, the Entry into Jerusalem. The cantata is based on Martin Luther's Advent hymn in eight stanzas "", the number one hymn to begin the Liturgical year in all Lutheran hymnals. The unknown poet retained the first and last stanza, paraphrased stanzas 2 and 3 to an aria, stanzas 4 and 5 to a recitative, the remaining stanzas to an aria and a duet recitative.

Bach first performed the cantata on 3 December 1724, and he performed it again in 1736, adding a part for violone in all movements, after the  had bought an instrument at an auction in 1735. Bach's successor Johann Friedrich Doles performed the cantata after Bach's death.

Scoring and structure 
The cantata in six movements is scored for four vocal soloists (soprano, alto, tenor, and bass), a four-part choir, and a Baroque instrumental ensemble of horn only to support the chorale melody, two oboes, two violins, viola, and basso continuo.

 Chorale: 
 Aria (tenor): 
 Recitative (bass): 
 Aria (bass): 
 Recitative (soprano, alto): 
 Chorale:

Music 
The old hymn tune is in four lines, the last one equal to the first. The instrumental ritornello of the opening chorus already quotes this line, first in the continuo, then slightly different in meter in the oboes. Other than these quotes, the orchestra plays a free concerto with the oboes introducing a theme, the first violin playing figuration. The ritornello appears shortened three times to separate the lines of the text and in full at the end. Alfred Dürr suggests that Bach was inspired to the festive setting in 6/4 time by the entry into Jerusalem. Christoph Wolff stresses that the instrumentation is simple because Advent was a "season of abstinence". Church music was allowed in Leipzig only on the first Sunday of Advent. This can be traced back both to qualities inherent in the chorale tune itself, and to the central place Bach gives to Luther's words."

The first aria deals with the mystery of "the Supreme Ruler appears to the world, … the purity will be entirely unblemished." in siciliano rhythm and string accompaniment, doubled in tutti-sections by the oboes. In great contrast the second aria stresses fight, "Struggle, conquer, powerful hero!", in a continuo line. In a later version it is doubled by the upper strings. Gardiner regards its "pompous, combative character" as a sketch for the aria "" (#8) from Part I of Bach's Christmas Oratorio. The duet recitative expresses thanks, "We honor this glory", intimately accompanied by the strings. The closing stanza is a four-part setting.

 Recordings 
 Cantatas,  Erhard Mauersberger, Thomanerchor, Gewandhausorchester, Adele Stolte, Gerda Schriever, Peter Schreier, Theo Adam, Eterna 1967
 J. S. Bach: Das Kantatenwerk – Sacred Cantatas Vol. 4, Nikolaus Harnoncourt, Tölzer Knabenchor, Concentus Musicus Wien, soloist of the Tölzer Knabenchor, Paul Esswood, Kurt Equiluz, Ruud van der Meer, Teldec 1977
 Die Bach Kantate Vol. 60, Helmuth Rilling, Gächinger Kantorei, Bach-Collegium Stuttgart, Inga Nielsen, Helen Watts, Aldo Baldin, Philippe Huttenlocher, Hänssler 1980
 J. S. Bach: Adventskantaten, John Eliot Gardiner, Monteverdi Choir, English Baroque Soloists, Nancy Argenta, Petra Lang, Anthony Rolfe Johnson, Olaf Bär, Archiv Produktion 1992
 J. S. Bach: Advent Cantatas, Philippe Herreweghe, Collegium Vocale Gent, Sibylla Rubens, Sarah Connolly, Christoph Prégardien, Peter Kooy, Harmonia Mundi France 1996. HMC901605.
 Bach Edition Vol. 12 – Cantatas Vol. 6, Pieter Jan Leusink, Holland Boys Choir, Netherlands Bach Collegium, Ruth Holton, Sytse Buwalda, Nico van der Meel, Bas Ramselaar, Brilliant Classics 1999
 J. S. Bach: Complete Cantatas Vol. 13, Ton Koopman, Amsterdam Baroque Orchestra & Choir, Deborah York, Franziska Gottwald, Paul Agnew, Klaus Mertens, Antoine Marchand 2000. CC72213.
 J. S. Bach: Cantatas Vol. 13, John Eliot Gardiner, Monteverdi Choir, English Baroque Soloists, Joanne Lunn, William Towers, Jan Kobow, Dietrich Henschel, Soli Deo Gloria 2000. SDG 162.
 J. S. Bach: Cantatas Vol. 28 – Cantatas from Leipzig 1724, Masaaki Suzuki, Bach Collegium Japan, Yukari Nonoshita, Robin Blaze, Makoto Sakurada, Peter Kooy, BIS 2004. BIS-1221.
 J. S. Bach: Cantatas for the Complete Liturgical Year Vol. 9'', Sigiswald Kuijken, La Petite Bande,  Gerlinde Sämann, Petra Noskaiová, Christoph Genz, Jan van der Crabben, Accent 2008. ACC25309.

References

External links 
 Nun komm, der Heiden Heiland, BWV 62: performance by the Netherlands Bach Society (video and background information)
 
 Cantata BWV 62 Nun komm, der Heiden Heiland history, scoring, sources for text and music, translations to various languages, discography, discussion, Bach Cantatas Website
 Luke Dahn: BWV 62.6 bach-chorales.com

Church cantatas by Johann Sebastian Bach
1724 compositions
Advent music
Chorale cantatas